In television, a ghost is a replica of the transmitted image, offset in position, that is superimposed on top of the main image. It is often caused when a TV signal travels by two different paths to a receiving antenna, with a slight difference in timing.

Analog ghosting 

Common causes of ghosts (in the more specific sense) are:
 Mismatched impedance along the communication channel, which causes unwanted reflections. The technical term for this phenomenon is ringing.
 Multipath distortion, because radio frequency waves may take paths of different length (by reflecting from buildings, transmission lines, aircraft, clouds, etc.) to reach the receiver. In addition, RF leaks may allow a signal to enter the set by a different path; this is most common in a large building such as a tower block or hotel where one TV antenna feeds many different rooms, each fitted with a TV aerial socket (known as pre-echo). By getting a better antenna or cable system it can be eliminated or mitigated.

Note that ghosts are a problem specific to the video portion of television, largely because it uses AM for transmission. The audio portion uses FM, which has the desirable property that a stronger signal tends to overpower interference from weaker signals due to the capture effect. Even when ghosts are particularly bad in the picture, there may be little audio interference.

SECAM TV uses FM for the chrominance signal, hence ghosting only affects the luma portion of its signal. TV is broadcast on VHF and UHF, which have line-of-sight propagation, and easily reflect off of buildings, mountains, and other objects.

Pre-echo

If the ghost is seen on the left of the main picture, then it is likely that the problem is pre-echo, which is seen in buildings with very long TV downleads where an RF leakage has allowed the TV signal to enter the tuner by a second route. For instance, plugging in an additional aerial to a TV which already has a communal TV aerial connection (or cable TV) can cause this condition.

Digital ghosting
Ghosting is not specific to analog transmission. It may appear in digital television when interlaced video is incorrectly deinterlaced for display on progressive-scan output devices. The mechanisms that cause ghosting in analog television may corrupt the signal beyond use for digital television. 8VSB, COFDM, and other modulation schemes seek to correct this.

See also
 Ghost-canceling reference
 Onion skinning

References

 
 

Television terminology
Radio electronics
Visual artifacts